= Battle of Italy =

Battle of Italy may refer to:

- The Italian campaign of the War of the Second Coalition in the French Revolutionary Wars, leading up to the Battle of Marengo
- The Allied invasion of Italy in 1943 in World War II
